Ectrosia is a genus of Asian, Australian, and Pacific Island plants in the grass family.

 Species
 Ectrosia agrostoides Benth. - Maluku, Aru Islands, Western Australia, Northern Territory, Queensland
 Ectrosia anomala C.E.Hubb. - Queensland
 Ectrosia appressa S.T.Blake - Queensland
 Ectrosia blakei C.E.Hubb. - Queensland, Northern Territory
 Ectrosia confusa C.E.Hubb. - Queensland, Northern Territory
 Ectrosia danesii Domin - Western Australia, Northern Territory, Queensland
 Ectrosia gulliveri F.Muell. - Queensland
 Ectrosia lasioclada (Merr.) S.T.Blake - Western Australia, Northern Territory, Queensland, New Guinea, Caroline Islands, Maluku, Philippines, Sulawesi, Lesser Sunda Islands
 Ectrosia laxa S.T.Blake - Western Australia, Northern Territory, Queensland
 Ectrosia leporina R.Br. - Western Australia, Northern Territory, Queensland, New Guinea, Sulawesi
 Ectrosia nervilemma (B.K.Simon) Night. - Queensland
 Ectrosia ovata Night. - Queensland
 Ectrosia scabrida C.E.Hubb. -  Western Australia, Northern Territory, Queensland
 Ectrosia schultzii Benth. - Western Australia, Northern Territory, Queensland

References

Chloridoideae
Poaceae genera